The Cerro Rabo de Mico is the highest mountain of the Cerros de Escazú, Costa Rica with .  The peak is accessible by trails from Escazu as well as Aserri, through the trail that leads past la Piedra de Aserri. Rabo de mico means literally 'monkey tail' although this denomination probably comes from a tree fern colloquially named likewise.

See also
Cerro Cedral
Cerro Pico Alto
Cerro Pico Blanco
Cerro San Miguel

References

Mountains of the Cerros de Escazú
Mountains of Costa Rica